Kaštel Gomilica is the oldest town in Kastela bay within the administrative area of Kaštela in Dalmatia, Croatia.

The town of Kaštela
The town of Kaštela is located on the coast of the Bay of Kaštela. It has over 40 000 inhabitants, and it is the second largest town in the Split and Dalmatia County. It stretches over the length of 17 kilometers.
The town is specific because it developed around 7 settlements or around castles. Kaštel Gomilica is the second of 7 "kaštels", counting from East.
Kaštel Sućurac
Kaštel Gomilica
Kaštel Kambelovac
Kaštel Lukšić
Kaštel Stari
Kaštel Novi
Kaštel Štafilić

History
Kaštel Gomilica was built in the first half of the 16th century by the Benedictine nuns from Split. The nuns built it on the estate (Pustica) which they received as a donation from King Zvonimir of Croatia in 1078. They also built the Romanesque Church of St. Cosmas and Damian in 1160, and erected a Catholic monastery on a small island known today Kaštilac. Kaštel Gomilica was used as one of the shooting locations in the HBO series Game of Thrones where it was used as a backdrop for the Free City of Braavos.

Sport
The town is home of NK GOŠK Kaštel Gomilica, an association football team previously called Jugovinil.

References

Populated places in Split-Dalmatia County